Wha Wha FC (sometimes spelt as WhaWha or HwaHwa) is a Zimbabwean football club based in Wha Wha on the outskirts of Gweru.

The club won promotion to the Zimbabwe Premier Soccer League in 2014 but were relegated in 2015.

References 

Football clubs in Zimbabwe
Gweru